Acrapex albivena is a species of moth of the family Noctuidae first described by George Hampson in 1910. It is found in Africa, including South Africa.

The wingspan is about 35 mm.

Description
Head and thorax black brown mixed with some ochreous; tarsi with slight pale rings; abdomen pale ochreous mixed with brown. Forewing ochreous whitish suffused and sprinkled with black brown leaving whitish streaks on the veins; a whitish streak in discal fold from near base to near termen, then bent upwards to apex; a diffused rufous fascia above vein 1; a terminal series of slight black points; cilia whitish at base, blackish at tips. Hindwing whitish suffused with fuscous brown; the underside whitish sprinkled with brown.

References

External links

Xyleninae
Moths of Africa